Vibrio anguillarum is a species of Gram-negative bacteria with a curved-rod shape and one polar flagellum. It is damaging to the economy of aquaculture sector and fishing industries.

See also
 Vibrio fischerii
 Vibrio harveyi
 Vibrio ordalii
 Vibrio tubiashii    
 Vibrio vulnificus    
 Serotype   
 Virulence

References

External links
Type strain of Vibrio anguillarum at BacDive -  the Bacterial Diversity Metadatabase

Vibrionales
Bacterial diseases of fish
Bacteria described in 1854